Ghanta Ghar, also known as the clock tower of Rajasthan, is in the Indian city of Jodhpur.

History 
The tower was built by Maharaja Sardar Singh, from whom the adjacent Sardar Market takes its name.

References

Clock towers in India
Tourist attractions in Jodhpur
Buildings and structures in Jodhpur